What About Today? is the eleventh studio album released in July 1969 by Barbra Streisand. It is considered to be her first attempt at recording contemporary pop songs and features songs by The Beatles and Paul Simon, among others.

Two singles were released to promote the album, one for the song "Frank Mills" (which had "Punky's Dilemma" as a B-side) and "Little Tin Soldier" (which featured as a B-side, the song " Honey Pie"), which managed to reach #35 on Billboard's Adult Contemporary music chart).

In 1993, it was re-released as part of the "Barbra Streisand Collection", a collection in which Columbia Records released eleven albums of the singer in compact disc. The album was not commercially successful like previous Streisand releases and became one of only three studio albums by the singer (the others being Barbra Streisand...and Other Musical Instruments, What Matters Most) not to receive record certification for sales around the world.

Background and production
In the late 1960s, rock was the music style that dominated the charts in the United States and many other countries. Columbia Records, concerned about the drop in Streisand's record sales (which until 1966 had been earning gold records with all of her albums and selling nearly 1 million with each of them worldwide) had plans to make the artist's repertoire more contemporary. The agent of this change was Clive Davis, who was brought to the record company by Goddard Lieberson, and managed to bring a significant change in the record company's catalog of artists which was still closely linked to artists from the Great American Songbook, the canon of American music composed by artists from the 1920s to the 1950s who sing jazz standards, traditional pop and show tunes. Davis had helped the label hire artists such as Janis Joplin, Bruce Springsteen, Chicago, Kenny Loggins, and Pink Floyd, which turned out to be a great investment. Despite disagreeing with the idea, Streisand followed Davis' advice. In 1968, a single was released for the song "The Morning After", which featured as a B-side the song "Where is the Wonder" from her 1965 My Name Is Barbra album, but despite having a more contemporary sound, the single did not appear on the music charts. 

The album was produced by Wally Gold, while Peter Matz conducted and arranged the songs: "Ask Yourself Why", "Honey Pie", "Punky's Dilemma", "That's a Fine Kind O' Freedom", "Little Tin Soldier" and "Goodnight". Don Costa arranged and conducted the tracks: "What About Today?" and "The Morning After". Michel Legrand was responsible for producing and conducting the orchestra on the songs "Until It's Time for You to Go", "With a Little Help from My Friends" and "Alfie", Legrand worked with the singer in many other albums. The photos from both cover and the back cover were taken by Richard Avedon, in 1968, one of the photos from the same shoot appeared in the March 1968 issue of Vogue. Four songs were recorded but not included in the final tracklisting "Chovendo na Roseira", by Tom Jobim, "Lost in Wonderland", "Tomorrow I Will Bring You a Rose" and "One Day" which was used in 1990s The Earth Day Special.

Critical reception

The album received mixed reviews from music critics. William Ruhlmann, from AllMusic website gave the album two stars out of five and wrote that it is an unsuccessful attempt by Streisand because she didn't seem to understand contemporary music at the time. He also wrote that although Streisand was two years younger than newcomers like Paul Simon and John Lennon, on the record, she sings like she was their mother. Writing for The New York Times, in October 1969, music critic Robert Christgau wrote an unfavorable review in which he stated that the singer was not suited to the music style chosen and that "not only is Streisand's emotion wasted on material so monotonous, as it is also shown as an arbitrary exercise". Billboard wrote that the album tunes "were carefully selected" and shows Streisand "astonishing vocal capabilities" and also a honest message to the youth.

Commercial performance
The album peaked at #31 on the Billboard 200 music chart and stayed there for seventeen weeks, making it the worst performance of an album by the singer at that time. In Canada, it peaked at #26 on April 10, 1969, on the RPM magazine chart.

Track listing

Side one
"What About Today?" (David Shire, Richard Maltby, Jr.) – 2:57
"Ask Yourself Why" from the motion picture The Swimming Pool (Alan Bergman, Marilyn Bergman, Michel Legrand) – 3:03
"Honey Pie" (John Lennon, Paul McCartney) – 2:39
"Punky's Dilemma" (Paul Simon) – 3:29
"Until It's Time for You to Go" (Buffy Sainte-Marie) – 2:55
"That's a Fine Kind O' Freedom" (Harold Arlen, Martin Charnin) - 3:02

Side two
"Little Tin Soldier" (Jimmy Webb) –3:53
"With a Little Help from My Friends" (Lennon, McCartney) – 2:40
"Alfie" (Burt Bacharach, Hal David) – 3:20
"The Morning After" (Maltby, Shire) – 2:40
"Goodnight" (Lennon, McCartney) – 3:44

Personnel
Barbra Streisand – singer, liner notes
Wally Gold – producer
Michel Legrand – arranger, conductor on tracks 5, 8, 9
Peter Matz – arranger, conductor on tracks 2-4, 6, 7, 11
Don Costa – arranger, conductor on tracks 1, 10
Don Meehan – recording engineer
Richard Avedon – photographer

Charts

Release history

References

External links
Official Site Discography
The Barbra Streisand Music Guide - What About Today?
Barbra Streisand Archives: Records/What About Today?

1969 albums
Barbra Streisand albums
Albums arranged by Michel Legrand
Albums arranged by Don Costa
Albums arranged by Peter Matz
Albums conducted by Michel Legrand
Albums conducted by Don Costa
Albums conducted by Peter Matz
Columbia Records albums